Finneytown High School is a public high school in the Finneytown neighborhood of Cincinnati, Ohio. It is the only public High School in the Finneytown Local School District. The district serves the neighborhood of Finneytown and surrounding Springfield Township.

Finneytown sports teams are known as the Wildcats. The Wildcats compete in the Cincinnati Hills League (CHL), a competitive small school league in the Cincinnati area. Finneytown has won over 35 league championships over its time in the CHL.

Academics
Finneytown offers the following 12 AP courses: AP Biology, AP English Language and Composition, AP English Literature and Composition, AP Art History, AP Psychology, AP Human Geography, AP U.S. History, AP U.S. Government, AP Chemistry, AP Computer Science Principles, AP Statistics, and AP Calculus AB. Finneytown offers many performing arts programs including orchestra, state recognized choir and band programs, and a theatrical program. The foreign language courses currently offered include Spanish at levels I, II, III, and IV, and French at levels I, II, III, and IV.

Ohio High School Athletic Association State Championships

 Boys Soccer – 1974, 1976, 1981
 Girls Swimming – 1979
 Wrestling - Kraig Keller, 132 lb) – 1981

Notable alumni

Amanda Borden '95 – 1996 Olympic Gold medalist in gymnastics.
Jeffrey R. Immelt '74 – former CEO and chairman of the board, General Electric.
Marco Marsan '75 – American author with three books.
Douglas E. Richards '80 – New York Times bestselling author.
Donavon Clark '11 – professional football player for the Los Angeles Chargers.
Aajonus Vonderplanitz '65 – nutritionist
Randall Einhorn '82 – television and film director, producer, and cinematographer, It's Always Sunny in Philadelphia, The Office (US)

References

External links
 District Website

High schools in Hamilton County, Ohio
Public high schools in Ohio